Yolla Yuliana (born 16 May 1994) is a Indonesian professional female volleyball player. Yolla started her career in volleyball at the 12 age at Alko Bandung. Currently she plays in the Proliga team, Bandung BJB Tandamata.

Personal life
Yolla was born in Bandung, West Java on 16 May 1994. Yolla's mother, Mira Mutiara, is known to have passed down her volleyball talent to Yolla. She received higher education at Bandung Raya University and STIA Bagasasi Bandung.

Honours
Proliga
Jakarta Elektrik PLN
Champion (1): 2014
Bandung BJB Tandamata
Champion (1): 2022
Jakarta BNI 46
Third place (1): 2018

References

External links

Living people
Indonesian volleyball players
People from Bandung
1994 births